Etibar Hajiyev (1971–92) is a National Hero of Azerbaijan. He was born in 1971 in the Zod village of the Basarkechar Rayon of the Armenian SSR. He died on 13 June 1992 during the Shaumyan offensive. 

Hajiyev was posthumously awarded National Hero of Azerbaijan by the President of Azerbaijan.

References

Armenian Azerbaijanis
1992 deaths
1971 births
Azerbaijani military personnel killed in action